Suren Nalbandyan (born June 3, 1956) is a former Soviet Armenian Greco-Roman wrestler. He is a five-time Soviet Champion, European Champion and Olympic Champion. He was awarded the Honoured Master of Sports of the USSR and USSR Badge of Honor titles in 1976.

Early life
Suren was born in the village of Geghard in the Abovyan region of the Armenian SSR. In 1964, his family moved to Astrakhan, where, in 1969, he began to compete in Greco-Roman wrestling under the leadership of Honored Coach of the RSFSR, Vladimir Fomin. He won the USSR Championship in 1972 and 1974 among junior.

Career
In 1975, Nalbandyan won the USSR Championship as a senior and won a gold medal at the Junior World Championship. In 1976, he won the Championship of the Soviet Union again and became a member of the USSR national Greco-Roman wrestling team.

Nalbandyan won a bronze medal at the 1976 European Wrestling Championships. Shortly afterward, he was chosen to participate at the 1976 Summer Olympics in Montreal. Nalbandyan won an Olympic gold medal. He became the first Armenian wrestler to become an Olympic Champion. The following year, he became the Champion of the USSR again and won a gold medal at the 1977 European Wrestling Championships. He was a member of the Soviet team at the 1980 Summer Olympics in Moscow, but came in fourth place and was unable to win a medal. Nalbandyan then completed his wrestling career.

He was never called up to compete at the World Wrestling Championships despite winning the Soviet Championships five times.

Later, Nalbandyan began coaching. He developed a scientific approach to the general physical, power and speed training of young wrestlers.

References

External links
Sports-Reference.com
Interview (in Russian)

1956 births
Living people
People from Kotayk Province
Soviet male sport wrestlers
Armenian male sport wrestlers
Honoured Masters of Sport of the USSR
Olympic wrestlers of the Soviet Union
Wrestlers at the 1976 Summer Olympics
Wrestlers at the 1980 Summer Olympics
Olympic gold medalists for the Soviet Union
Olympic medalists in wrestling
Medalists at the 1976 Summer Olympics
Soviet Armenians
European Wrestling Championships medalists